Dor Salamah (Sabah) is a village of Sibah District in the Abyan Governorate, Yemen.
According to the 2004 census, Dor Salamah (Sabah) has a population of 81.

References

External links
Towns and villages in the Abyan Governorate

Populated places in Abyan Governorate
Villages in Yemen